Leng Makara (born 7 January 1990) is a Cambodian footballer who plays for Nagaworld.

International career 
Makara made his international debut in the 2018 FIFA World Cup qualification – AFC Second Round against Syria on 24 March 2016.

Honours 
Phnom Penh Crown
Winner
 Cambodian League: 2014, 2015

References

External links 
 

1990 births
Living people
Cambodian footballers
Cambodia international footballers
People from Koh Kong province
Association football forwards
Nagaworld FC players
Phnom Penh Crown FC players